This page covers the record of the Hong Kong national football team in the FIFA World Cup and the Asian Cup. In the "Results" section, home results are written before away results. Where Hong Kong only played a team once, (h), (a) and (n) indicates home, away and neutral.

Major Tournaments

Regional Tournaments

East Asian Dynasty Cup 1995

East Asian Dynasty Cup 1998

2003 East Asian Football Championship

2005 East Asian Football Championship

2008 East Asian Football Championship

2010 East Asian Football Championship

2013 EAFF East Asian Cup

2015 EAFF East Asian Cup

2017 EAFF E-1 Football Championship

2019 EAFF E-1 Football Championship

2022 EAFF E-1 Football Championship

References

External links
Asian Nations Cup at RSSSF
World Cup at RSSSF
East Asian Cup at RSSSF
International Football Results 1872-Present

Record